The lieutenant governor of Minnesota is a constitutional officer in the executive branch of the U.S. State of Minnesota. Fifty individuals have held the office of lieutenant governor since statehood. The incumbent is Peggy Flanagan, a DFLer and the first Native American elected to a statewide executive office in Minnesota's history.

Powers and duties
The lieutenant governor assists the governor in carrying  out  the  functions  of  the  executive  branch, as  well  as  serving  in  the  governor’s  place  in  the  event  of  his or her absence  or  disability. The  governor,  as prescribed  by  law,  may  file  a  written  order  with  the  secretary  of  state  to  delegate  to  the  lieutenant governor  any  powers,  duties,  responsibilities,  or  functions  otherwise performed  by  the  governor. As a key member of the governor's cabinet, the lieutenant governor is consulted on all major policy and budgetary decisions. Moreover, the lieutenant governor is a statutory member of the Executive Council and chairs the Capitol Area Architectural Planning Board, among other responsibilities.

History
In 1886, elections were moved from odd years to even years. Beginning with the 1962 election, the term of the lieutenant governor increased from two to four years. Prior to the 1974 election, governors and lieutenant governors were elected on separate ballots, with the lieutenant governor having independent legislative authority as president of the senate. Since 1974, the lieutenant governor has been relieved of the duty to preside over the state senate and is elected on a joint ticket with the governor. Marlene Johnson, elected in 1982 as the running mate of Rudy Perpich, was the first female lieutenant governor of Minnesota. All eight of her successors in that office have also been women.

List
Parties

1 Richardson was actually president pro tem of the Minnesota Senate; became acting lieutenant governor when lieutenant governor Hjalmar Petersen became governor on the death of Floyd B. Olson, but Richardson was never sworn in. 

2 Wright was president pro tem of the Minnesota Senate and assumed the office of lieutenant governor in 1954 after Lieutenant Governor Ancher Nelsen resigned to become administrator of the Rural Electric Administration. 

3 As president of the Minnesota Senate, Olson assumed office of lieutenant governor when Rudy Perpich, then lieutenant governor, became governor on the resignation of Wendell Anderson, who had appointed himself to the United States Senate on resignation of Walter Mondale who had been elected vice president.  

4 As president of the Minnesota Senate, Fischbach became lieutenant governor following the resignation of Tina Smith. Smith was appointed by Governor Mark Dayton to fill the United States Senate seat vacated by Al Franken. Fischbach resigned from the state Senate and took the oath of office for lieutenant governor on May 25, 2018.

Note on Minnesota political parties names
Minnesota Democratic–Farmer–Labor Party: On April 15, 1944, the Minnesota Democratic Party and the Minnesota Farmer–Labor Party merged and created the Minnesota Democratic–Farmer–Labor Party (DFL). It is affiliated with the national Democratic Party.
Republican Party of Minnesota: From November 15, 1975, to September 23, 1995, the name of the state Republican party was the Independent Republican party (IR). The party has always been affiliated with the national Republican Party.
Independence Party of Minnesota: The party was founded under this name in 1992. In 1995 the IPM affiliated with the national Reform Party and renamed itself the Reform Party of Minnesota. In 2000 the Reform Party of Minnesota disaffiliated with the national Reform party and returned to the name Independence party.

See also
Governor of Minnesota
List of governors of Minnesota

References

Minnesota Lieutenant Governors 1858- Minnesota Legislative Reference Library.
MHS.org's list

 
Lieutenant Governors
Lieut
Minnesota